Ulmus 'Wingham' is a complex hybrid elm cultivar featuring two Asiatic and two European species, bestowing it with an exceptionally high resistance to Dutch elm disease (DED). It was raised as clone no. FL493 by the Istituto per la Protezione delle Piante (IPP) in Florence, but never patented owing to its limited aesthetic appeal. It was introduced to the UK in 2011 by the late Dr David Herling, Resistant Elms, who trialled it successfully at Wingham in Kent. It was later trialled by Hampshire & Isle of Wight Branch, Butterfly Conservation, as part of an assessment of DED-resistant cultivars as potential hosts of the endangered White-letter Hairstreak. 'Wingham' was released for sale in the UK in 2019.

Description
Branching is typically rather irregular and unbalanced, but the foliage strongly resembles that of its ancestor, U. × hollandica ‘Vegeta’, better known as the Huntingdon Elm, the colour ranging from mid-green to a dark malachite. The samarae are generally obovate, typically 25 × 16 mm, the seed central, with relatively long petioles.

Pests and diseases
Tested by inoculation with the pathogen, 'Wingham' displayed an extraordinary resistance ('5 out of 5') to Dutch Elm Disease, exhibiting defoliation of just 1.44%, with 0% dieback, one of the highest of all the 1000+ clones raised by IPP, Italy.

Cultivation
'Wingham' has excelled in the UK where planted on fertile alluvium in river valleys, but has struggled on poorer chalk and clay soils, emulating the 'English' Elm U. minor 'Atinia'. At the Castellaccio trials site in Italy, specimens increased in height by up to 1.94 m per annum, with a commensurate increase in girth of 2.84 cm.  Among urban plantings in the UK are two specimens in Regent Road Park, Edinburgh. The clone is not known elsewhere beyond Italy in continental Europe, and has not been introduced to North America or Australasia.

Etymology
'Wingham' is named for the village in Kent where the tree was successfully trialled.

Accessions

Europe
Grange Farm Arboretum, Sutton St James, Spalding, Lincs., UK. Acc. no. 1260
Priors Hold Farm, Boarhunt, Hants., UK. Butterfly Conservation Elm Trials plantation, planted 2013.
Icomb Place, Icomb, Gloucestershire, Elm trials, planted 2014

Nurseries
Frank P. Matthews Ltd., Tenbury Wells, Worcs., UK

References

Hybrid elm cultivar
Ulmus articles with images
Ulmus